Hazrat Nizamuddin railway station  (station code: NZM) is a railway station in South Delhi, India.  It is under the administrative control of the Delhi Division of the Northern Railway zone of the Indian Railways. It is one of the five main stations in Delhi and handles nearly 250 trains daily The station was named after the Sufi saint, Hazrat Nizamuddin. Hazrat Nizamuddin station was upgraded to help relieve congestion at New Delhi railway station and is recommended for first time travellers, particularly those bound for Agra as it much quieter and easier to navigate.

The station is very close to Sarai Kale Khan - Nizamuddin metro station on the Pink Line of Delhi Metro.

Administration 

Hazrat Nizamuddin railway station is managed by Northern Railway zone of Indian Railways. It is adjacent to Delhi's two important arteries, the Ring Road and Mathura Road, and Sarai Kale Khan ISBT.

Services 
It originates and terminates Rajdhani Express trains going towards Bengaluru, Chennai, Secunderabad, Madgaon, Mumbai and Thiruvananthapuram.

Following passenger friendly facilities  has been developed by the Indian Railways at the Railway station,as part of its redevelopment and beautification drive:

1.Platforms numbers 2 and 3 have vacuum dewatered flooring which are slip resistant and easier to clean as it enables surplus water from the concrete to be removed easily and immediately.

2.For maintaining hygiene and avoiding littering of papers and plastic several dustbins have been kept which helped in proper cleaning and sanitation inside the premises. There are separate dustbins for dry and wet waste helping in the segregation of biodegradable and non biodegradable disposal of wastage.

3.Lifts and escalators have been installed on all platforms for continuous connectivity with the entry and exit points of the Railway station.This has helped in easy and free movements of passengers.

4.Around 300 new steel benches have been installed around platforms, waiting halls, retiring rooms, and near the ticket counters for the convenience of passengers especially physically handicapped senior citizens and ladies.

5.There are 2 main RO drinking water systems which are fully functional with a capacity of 3000 litres of water per hour and operating 24/7 for the convenience of passengers. In addition to these, there are RO drinking taps which have been installed at various parts of station for the convenience of passengers. There are around six water vending machines at entry, exit and various parts of platforms providing clean drinking water to the passengers at economical cost.

6.Station building has been newly painted with texture paint and the prefabricated shelters for the passengers with new colour scheme as part of Indian Railways' beautification initiative. The boundary walls of the station along the approach road has been beautified with traditional mural paintings.

7.Train information boards have been made digital displaying the arrival and departure of trains along with their name, number, platform number and timings. These have been installed at entry, exit and various places in platform.

8.For booking complaints on cleaning and sanitation a helpline number '138' has been started at the station. The number has been displayed across all waiting halls and platforms so that the passenger can call and book complaints anytime on cleaning and sanitation.

9.To keep the platforms cooler and illuminated continuously, a polycarbonate sheet(green coloured sheet)has been installed on platforms' roof.

10. Marshalls are deployed across all platforms for constant vigil and security at the station in addition to regulation of passenger traffic. In addition, Delhi police officials are deployed at the station entry and exit points for the safety of passengers. CCTV cameras are installed across all platforms and near station offices to monitor the passengers and is constantly monitored from Director's office.

In addition to the above facilities, for the convenience of travellers a premium parking has been developed in front of the station building. For proper regulation of incoming and outgoing vehicles, dedicated lanes have been developed for autos, taxis, Ola and Uber and pick up and drop lanes in the circulating area. As part of landscaping and greenery, green patches have also been developed around the circulating area. The entry and exit road have been decorated with fountains.

Rooftop Solar 

Indian Railways intends to save ₹41,000 crore in energy consumption and generate 1000 megawatts (MW) from solar power. Out of 1000 MW to be produced under solar power; 500 MW will be produced from rooftop solar. In order to meet the target Northern Railways has selected Vivaan Solar, a Gwalior based company to install 0.6 MW of rooftop solar project at the railway station in 2016. The solar power project to be set up under Public Private Partnership is to be executed under design, build, finance, operate and transfer (DBFOT) basis. The company will also be responsible for maintaining the plant for a period of 25 years.

See also 
Sarai Kale Khan - Nizamuddin metro station
Sarai Kale Khan Inter-State Bus Terminus
 Delhi Junction railway station
 Anand Vihar Terminal railway station
 
 Delhi Metro
 Victoria Terminus

References

External links 

Railway stations in South Delhi district
Delhi railway division
Year of establishment missing